Thwaites railway station was a railway station located just east of Keighley, West Riding of Yorkshire, on the Midland Railway line through the Aire Valley between Keighley and Shipley. It opened to traffic in 1892 and closed 17 years later in 1909 due to poor patronage.

History
By 1846, amalgamations had seen the L&BER become part of the Midland Railway (MR) The population centres in the Aire Valley were served by the line at Shipley,  and Keighley. Demands from local people that the MR build a station at  went unheeded, but they did build a station at Thwaites, a suburb in the eastern part of Keighley.

The station opened in 1892 during a period of improvements on the line; Bingley railway station was resited in 1892 and the widening of the line between Bingley and Thwaites Junction was started at that time. Thwaites railway station was only open for a mere 17 years before it was closed by the Midland Railway in 1909. The station was a small concern being able to handle only passenger and parcels traffic; no goods sidings were installed at the station, although just east of the station was the Keighley Gas Works and Thwaites Junction, where the line ran along a quadruple track section to the outskirts of Bingley railway station.

Falling passenger numbers and dwindling income led the MR to close the station. In the Bradshaw timetable for 1896, only two trains per day stopped at the station. The MR had hoped that the Keighley Tramway would be extended to Thwaites, so a station was deemed to no longer be necessary. The tramway never extended into Thwaites itself, and the tram system was abolished in Keighley by 1925. Thereafter, buses from Keighley ran past the site.

References

Sources

Disused railway stations in Bradford
Former Midland Railway stations
Railway stations in Great Britain opened in 1892
Railway stations in Great Britain closed in 1909
1892 establishments in England
1909 disestablishments in England